José Luis Arrieta Lujambio (born 15 June 1971, in San Sebastián) is a retired Spanish professional road racing cyclist. He last rode for UCI ProTour team .

Arrieta was a devoted domestique for Miguel Induráin. L'Équipe said of him: "He no longer counts the hours, the years, spent with his nose in the wind trying to protect his leader for as long as possible."

Arrieta said:

Career achievements

Major results

1989
 1st  Road race, National Junior Road Championships
1991
 3rd Overall Circuito Montañes
1st Stage 6
1993
 9th Overall Circuit Cycliste Sarthe
1997 
 6th Overall Grand Prix du Midi Libre
1998
 6th Trofeo Comunidad Foral de Navarra
 6th Overall Vuelta a la Comunidad Valenciana
2000
 9th Overall Euskal Bizikleta
2002
 1st Stage 1 Vuelta Asturias
 1st Metas Volantes classification Grande Prémio Internacional de Ciclismo MR Cortez-Mitsubishi
2003
 9th Overall Euskal Bizikleta
2004
 1st Stage 2 Vuelta a Castilla y León (TTT)
2005
 4th Clásica a los Puertos
2006
 1st Stage 19 Vuelta a España

Grand Tour general classification results timeline

References

External links
Profile at AG2R Prévoyance website

L'Equipe rider profile

1971 births
Living people
Cyclists from the Basque Country (autonomous community)
Spanish male cyclists
Spanish Vuelta a España stage winners
Sportspeople from San Sebastián